Emila L. Huch (born 15 June 1951) is a Samoan former weightlifter. He competed in the men's middle heavyweight event at the 1984 Summer Olympics.

References

External links
 

1951 births
Living people
Samoan male weightlifters
Olympic weightlifters of Samoa
Weightlifters at the 1984 Summer Olympics
Place of birth missing (living people)